The Trupele de Carabinieri (Carabinier Troops in English) is the national gendarmerie force of the Republic of Moldova, under the administration of the Ministry of Internal Affairs of Moldova. The Moldovan Carabinieri are to ensure, together with the police or independently, public order, protection of rights and freedoms of citizens, owners' properties and prevention of violations of the law. The structure of the agency is based on the Italian Carabinieri, where it gets its name. The Department of Carabineer Troops has 5 Military Units and some 2,000 soldiers working on a contract basis or on time.

History
On December 12, 1991, the establishment of the Carabinieri Troops was approved by the Parliament and subsequently signed by the President of the Republic of Moldova on the basis of the Internal Troops of the Ministry of Internal Affairs of Moldova, themselves formations that before independence served as part of the Internal Troops of the Ministry of Internal Affairs of the Moldovan SSR. On March 13, 1992, a Carabinieri subdivision headed into the Transnistria region to serve on the Moldovan side of the Transnistria War. Over a week later, during the assault near the village of Coșnița, many soldiers of the Carabinieri were killed in its first engagement during the conflict. On August 24, 1993, the Carabinieri began fulfilling its tasks objectives, for which was approved by President Mircea Snegur 2 years earlier. In February 1998 the units and subunits of the Carabinieri troops participated in the liquidation of the natural disasters in the village of Hîncești.

Structure

Central Apparatus
Operational Management Directorate
Public Order and Safety Section
Security and institutional protection section
Mission planning, organization and coordination section
Human Resources Management Directorate
Personal Administration Section
Training Section
Education and Social Protection Section
Logistics Department
Planning and Procurement Service
Military technical service and armament
Intendance Service
Service of capital construction, accommodation and operation
Financial Directorate
Directorate of Security and Investigations
Directorate for International Cooperation, Project Management and Public Relations
Department of Psychological Assistance
Legal Section
Medical Section
Documentation Service
Service of Communications and Information Technologies
Mobilization and Special Transports Section

DTC Subdivisions
Operational Center
Military band
The "Credo" Choir
Sports Team
Prophylactic Curative Center and Medico-Military Expertise
Insurance Center

Band of the Carabinier Troops
The Band of the Department of Carabinier Troops of the MAI is the sole military band of the Carabinier Troops, currently led by Lieutenant Oleg Casacu. It was founded on 1 April 1994, at the initiative of Colonel Nicolae Usaciov. It was created under the name of "Military Band of the Carabinier Troops". On 21 February 2002, the band's name was extended to reflect the DTC's full name. The band participates actively in cultural and artistic activities for the DTC (particularly military oath ceremonies and demonstrations organized by the government). It also participates in festivals and military tattoos in different countries such as Switzerland, Germany, France, Italy, Belgium, and Russia. In June 2015, the band won 1st Prize for being the best marching contingent in a concert in Italy. On the 20th anniversary of Moldova's independence in 2011, the band played Limba noastră (the national anthem) on Moldovan TV station Publika TV. It is on par with the Presidential Orchestra of the Republic of Moldova in the National Army and the Central Band of the Moldovan Border Police.

The following is a list of the band's music directors:

 Colonel Nicolae Usaciov (1994-2003)
 Captain Anatole Grischa (2003-2004)
 Colonel Ghenadie Tutunaru (2004-2010)
 Lieutenant Oleg Casacu (2010–Present)

Choir
The "Credo" Chamber Choir is a musical subdivision of the DTC. It has given concerts both on stage in the country and abroad. It is distinguished with numerous titles and awards. It has been honored with the title of winner at 25 international competitions in: Germany, Poland, Austria, Ukraine, Belgium, Bulgaria, United Kingdom, France, Belarus, Netherlands, Malta and Switzerland, being awarded with the Grand Prix, 12 medals Gold and 7 Silver.

Sports Team
The sports team is made up of military sportsmen who actively participate in the Olympics, international and European championships. It prepares jointly with the central sports club "Dinamo", the Sports Agency, and the National Olympic Committee.

Units
Military Unit 1001
Military Unit 1002
Military Unit 1003
Military Unit 1006
Military Unit 1045

See also
Gendarmerie
Carabinier
Carabinieri
Carabineros
Carabineros de Chile

Notes and references

External links
Official website  
 Official YouTube Channel
 The band interpreting Limba Nostra on Moldovan TV
 The band on the TV show, Cine vine la noi?

Gendarmerie
Law enforcement in Moldova
Military units and formations established in 1991
Military of Moldova